The 1985 D.C. National Bank Classic was a men's tennis tournament and was played on outdoor green clay courts. The event was part of the 1985 Grand Prix circuit. It was the 17th edition of the tournament and was held at Rock Creek Park in Washington, D.C. from July 15 through July 21, 1985. Third-seeded Yannick Noah won the singles title and earned $35,700 first-prize money.

Finals

Singles
 Yannick Noah defeated  Martín Jaite 6–4, 6–3
 It was Noah's 2nd singles title of the year and the 16th of his career.

Doubles
 Hans Gildemeister /  Víctor Pecci defeated  David Graham /  Balázs Taróczy 6–3, 1–6, 6–4

References

External links
 ATP tournament profile
 ITF tournament edition details

Washington Open (tennis)
Washington Star International
Washington Star International
Washington Star International